This is the schedule of Professional Darts Corporation (PDC) events on the 2018 calendar, with player progression documented from the quarterfinals stage where applicable. This list includes European tour events, Players Championships events, World Series of Darts events and PDC majors. This list includes some regional tours, such as the ones in Nordic, Baltic and Oceanic regions, but does not include British Darts Organisation (BDO) events.

January

February

March

April

May

June

July

August

September

October

November

December

See also
List of players with a 2018 PDC Tour Card
2018 PDC Pro Tour

References

Professional Darts Corporation
2018 in darts